Jose Claveria de Venecia Jr., also known as JDV, Joe De V or Manong Joe (born December 26, 1936), is a former Speaker of the House of Representatives of the Philippines, serving from 1992 to 1998 and from 2001 to 2008. As Speaker, he was the fourth highest-ranking official of the Philippines.  He was the former president of the Philippines' dominant party, Lakas-CMD. He ran for president in the 1998 election, but lost to Vice President Joseph Estrada, finishing second among 11 candidates.

Beginning in 1987, De Venecia has been elected to six terms as a Representative of the 4th district of Pangasinan. He served as Speaker of the Philippine House of Representatives throughout the Ninth, Tenth, Twelfth and Thirteenth Congresses of the Philippines. He had served for more than a year as the House Speaker of the Fourteenth Congress when on February 5, 2008, 174 representatives, or a considerable majority of members of the House, voted to remove de Venecia as Speaker. He is the first Filipino who has held the Speakership five times in separate terms. He was conferred an Honorary Doctorate in International Relations from the University of Cambodia in 2008.

Early life and career
De Venecia was born in Dagupan to Judge Jose R. de Venecia Sr. and Casimira Villamil Clavería. In 1947, he finished his elementary studies at the Dagupan Elementary School where he was accelerated by one year. He completed his secondary education at the De La Salle College High School, and finished Journalism at the Ateneo de Manila, being an outstanding Associate Editor of The Guidon and Editor-in-Chief of the school annual, The Aegis.

As an entrepreneur, de Venecia pioneered overseas contract work for Filipinos where he was one of the first Philippine prime contractors in the Middle East and North Africa in the mid-1970s. He hired 51,000 Filipinos for his companies and engaged in port operations in Saudi Arabia, agriculture in Africa, and mass housing and oil exploration in the United Arab Emirates. His Middle East initiative was followed and later led to the employment of millions of Filipinos. In the 1970s, he was initiated an oil and gas exploration program that led to the first oil and gas strikes in offshore Palawan. He was elected president of the Petroleum Association of the Philippines.

De Venecia was a diplomat as Minister-Economic Counselor from 1966 to 1969. He conceived and implemented the historic dollar-remittance program for overseas Filipino workers worldwide. He was one of the Ten Outstanding Congressmen before martial law in the Philippines.

De Venecia came from an influential political family. His grandfather, Guillermo de Venecia was the  municipal president (now known as mayor) from 1916 to 1918 and from 1925 to 1926. He ran and won as congressman of the 2nd district of Pangasinan from 1969 to 1972. After the restoration of the House of Representatives in 1987, he ran and won as congressman of the fourth district of Pangasinan.

Speaker of the House (1992-1998)
He was reelected in 1992 and joined the newly created party, Lakas Tao, of President Fidel Ramos. He initiated the move to unite the National Union of Christian Democrats, a cluster of the Progressive Party of the Philippines, the Union of Muslim Democrats, and the Lakas Tao to make it a dominant party. That same year, he was elected Speaker of the House of Representatives. Since Ramos got a low plurality in the election, De Venecia created a Rainbow Coalition, converging political parties that include the LDP, NPC, Lakas NUCD, and other minor parties to make a solid majority in the House. He was reelected as congressman and speaker in 1995.

Peace envoy
As Ramos' peace envoy, Speaker De Venecia reached out to insurgent groups Moro National Liberation Front (MNLF) secessionists in Mindanao, the RAM-SFP-YOU military rebels, and the Communist Party of the Philippines which operates the New People's Army (NPA). He crossed Africa's Sahara Desert twice to meet the Libyan leader Muammar al-Gaddafi and MNLF Chairman Nur Misuari and assisted in forging a peace agreement at Tripoli in 1976. His persuasion to Misuari to accept autonomy led to the signing of the peace pact on September 2, 1996.

In 1992, De Venecia began secret talks with leaders of the military rebels, led by Commodore Calajate, Gen. Abenina, and Col. Honasan, which led to a ceasefire in December of that year and a final peace agreement in 1995. In April 1997, De Venecia journeyed to the Netherlands to meet with self-exiled leaders of the National Democratic Front and New People's Army led by Jose Maria Sison and Luis Jalandoni. He was the first Christian leader to enter Mindanao's Camp Abubakar mountains in November 1997 and open breakthrough peace negotiations with Hashim Salamat, Chairman of the Moro Islamic Liberation Front (MILF), and military Commander Murad.

1998 presidential election

In 1998, the dominant party Lakas-NUCD-UMDP held a convention to select Ramos' successor as titular president and candidate for the May 11 election. A long list of candidates was trimmed and led to a choice between De Venecia and then National Defense Secretary Renato de Villa. Though De Villa was seen as the frontrunner, De Venecia won the convention vote and De Villa bolted the party to form a new one called Partido Reporma.

De Venecia garnered the second highest number of votes in a field of 11 candidates, though he was far behind the winner, Joseph Estrada. After he lost his bid, he departed from media attention and political limelight. In one of his interviews, De Venecia said that he was depressed and took several months to recover.

Reentry to the politics
De Venecia reemerged on New Year's Day of 2001 calling for a smooth transition of power to the Vice President. Estrada belittled de Venecia's  statements, however, the former was ousted January 20 of that year.

Speaker of the House (2001-2008)
In the 2001 election, he won without opposition as congressman of the 4th District of Pangasinan. He was reelected overwhelmingly by the House, and was voted by some critical left-wing partylist representatives. In 2003, he received an unexpected high commendation from the public when he accepted the Supreme Court ruling that junked the petition for the impeachment of the Chief Justice.  In the 2004 election, he became instrumental for Gloria Macapagal Arroyo's victory as president. He also won by a landslide as congressman and was reelected as speaker for the fourth time.

NBN-ZTE scandal
On July 10, 2007, De Venecia's supporters opposed secret balloting by the majority coalition to select the speaker of the House of Representatives in the Fourteenth Congress. Rep. Eduardo Zialcita of Parañaque, said the House is not a "secret society."  Meanwhile, Sorsogon Rep. Jose Solis accused De Venecia's son, Jose de Venecia III, for questioning a $330 million broadband connection deal between the Philippine government and Chinese firm ZTE.
Solis hit De Venecia III for desiring to have his Amsterdam Holdings, Inc. (AHI) get the deal (which will connect national government agencies to local government units through the Internet and save government up to P3 billion in telephone expenses every year). Solis further claimed  that AHI is a "veritable mom's-and-pop's enterprise with a reported paid-up capital of only P650,000. How can AHI possibly undertake this project when it may not even have enough funds to run a mini grocery?"

Re-election as Speaker
On July 23, 2007, 159 lawmakers picked De Venecia House Speaker for 5th time—after the House commenced at 2:17 pm, a roll-call vote for the position. De Venecia was the lone nominee, while his opponent, Cebu Rep. Pablo Garcia, was not nominated. Iloilo Rep. Arthur Defensor was elected Majority Leader while San Juan Rep. Ronaldo Zamora was elected minority leader. The 14th Congress of the House of Representatives is composed of 240 lawmakers, 21 of whom are party-list representatives.

Ousted as Speaker
On January 31, 2008, Kabalikat ng Malayang Pilipino (KAMPI) announced that 134 congressmen signed a manifesto of "loss of confidence" versus Speaker Jose de Venecia Jr. Camarines Sur's 2nd district Rep. Luis Villafuerte, KAMPI president, said the successor should be Davao City's 1st district representative Prospero Nograles.

During the regular session on February 4, 2008, Palawan Representative Abraham Kahlil Mitra moved that the position of House Speaker be declared vacant. Before the motion was submitted to a vote, De Venecia delivered a speech before the House where he criticized President Gloria Macapagal Arroyo and alleged that her government was behind the move to oust him from the speakership. He recounted the times he had stood to defend President Arroyo, and said, "It pains me grievously to hurt the President and to hurt the First Family because I have invested so much more than any of you in this chamber to help the President become Vice President, become President…." Shortly after his remarks, de Venecia acknowledged to reporters: "I will join the opposition to denounce corruption in this administration. I will join the battle against corruption."

During his speech at the House plenary, De Venecia said that three military generals visited his house. They were accompanied by Raul Lambino.

De Venecia's son reported the incident to the Makati police. The Speaker, meanwhile, wrote a letter to President Arroyo to ask her to do something about the threat on their lives.

The Speaker said he asked Mrs. Arroyo in a letter to "please do something."

"It's simple arrogance. Just plain arrogance that Malacañang and the people of the Palace are above the law. Someday this can happen to you," he said. The speech was delivered hours after Palawan's 2nd district Rep. Abraham Kahlil Mitra, an ally of Davao City Rep. Prospero Nograles, moved the speaker's position be declared vacant.

Post-speakership
Shortly after midnight, February 5, 2008, 174 members of the House voted in favor of the motion to declare the position of House Speaker as vacant, removing de Venecia from his position. 35 members voted against the motion while 16 members abstained. Nograles was elected as the new House Speaker.

On March 10, 2008, Mr. De Venecia resigned his post as president of Lakas-CMD.  Since then he has remained active. In 2010 he travelled to the United States to speak to Filipino people who were living and working there. He mentioned that overseas workers sent over $18 billion home every year and said about this: "This is your contribution. You must be aware of it, you should be proud of it. This is why we call you the heroes and heroines of the Filipino people."

In April 2017, De Venecia was appointed by President Rodrigo Duterte as Special Envoy for Inter-Cultural Dialogue. The Department of Foreign Affairs said that as special envoy, De Venecia will serve to advise the administration on policies regarding cultural diversity and citizen participation under the UNESCO declaration.

Performance rating
On January 7, 2008, the Social Weather Stations (November 30 to December 3, 2007) survey stated that Speaker Jose de Venecia's performance rating has 37% satisfied and 37% dissatisfied, or net +1, having been in single digit since December 2004.

Personal life
De Venecia married Victoria Perez, the daughter of Eugenio Pérez, who served as Speaker of the House of Representatives from 1946 to 1953. Together, they had 4 children: Alexandra (Sandra), Leslie, Vivian, and Jose III (Joey). Their marriage, ended in a divorce, and Perez now lives in Albany, New York.

De Venecia then married Georgina Vera-Perez, daughter of Filipino film producer Jose Vera Perez. They have two children: Christopher and Kristina Casimira (KC). Georgina, also known as Manay Gina, was previously married to construction manager Felipe Cruz with whom she had 2 children. The former host of a television drama series, she is currently a social worker and a radio host.

House fire
On December 17, 2004, a fire originating from Christmas tree lights gutted de Venecia's house in Dasmariñas Village, Makati. His 16-year-old daughter KC died of suffocation after being trapped inside the house.  KC's remains were cremated and her ashes were buried at the Santuario de San Antonio chapel in Makati.

References
Resume/CV of Jose de Venecia
Dagupan History

External links
The biography of Jose de Venecia Jr.
The official website of Jose de Venecia Jr.
The official website of the Philippine House of Representatives

Notes

|-

|-

|-

1936 births
Living people
De La Salle University alumni
Candidates in the 1998 Philippine presidential election
People from Dagupan
20th-century Filipino businesspeople
Speakers of the House of Representatives of the Philippines
Members of the House of Representatives of the Philippines from Pangasinan
Lakas–CMD (1991) politicians
Liberal Party (Philippines) politicians
Laban ng Demokratikong Pilipino politicians
Duterte administration personnel